Valley Heights is a small township of the City of Blue Mountains in New South Wales, Australia.

Valley Heights developed its own piece of the ridgeline that has been the main route west from Sydney since colonial history, and has some strong evidence of a rich pre-colonial inhabitance.  At an elevation of 300 to 320 metres (980–1,050 ft) above sea level, the climate has been considered very conducive to a huge range of plants.  The native ecological communities are fairly typical of other Hawkesbury sandstone with shale transition forests, yet exhibit the local specificness we have come to expect in the Blue Mountains, NSW.  Current development is restricted by council reserves and National Park

Valley Heights has a railway station, rail museum and the historic Gatekeepers cottage where the gatekeeper employed by the railway lived in the early steam era.

History
Valley Heights is a small historic railway town located in the lower foothills of the Blue Mountains. It developed in the 19th century around the railway station with a platform called Eagar's Platform, now known as Valley Heights railway station, after the colonial politician and treasurer Geoffrey Eagar, who lived in a house just opposite the railway station. In 1880, it was officially renamed Valley Heights to its present name.

On 31 January 1914, the Valley Heights Locomotive Depot was opened. As part of a railway museum, its locomotive depot was added to the New South Wales State Heritage Register on 2 April 1999.

Heritage listings
Valley Heights has a number of heritage-listed sites, including:
 110 and 112 Green Parade: Valley Heights railway gatehouse
 Main Western railway: Valley Heights railway station
 17b Tusculum Road: Valley Heights Steam Tram Rolling Stock

Commercial area
Valley Heights' commercial area centres on and north of the Great Western Highway, comprising light industrial and hardware retail services.

Churches
 St Marks Anglican Church operated in Valley Heights for many years before closing in the late 1980s.
 Valley Heights Community Church met at Blue Mountains Grammar Valley Heights campus, as part of  Anglican Churches Springwood from 2005 to 2012. This congregation has now merged with Factory Morning Church at Anglican Churches Springwood.

Schools 
 The Preparatory Campus of the Blue Mountains Grammar School was built in Valley Heights in 2003.
 Other primary and secondary schools are in nearby Springwood and Winmalee

Transport

Railway
Valley Heights has a railway station on the Blue Mountains Line of the NSW TrainLink intercity network. 
 
Valley Heights is the start of the steeply graded, 1 in 33 (3%) section to Katoomba. The gradient approaching Valley Heights from Sydney is 1 in 60 (1.67%). In older times, assistant engines were attached here to uphill trains, which explains the existence of the roundhouse, now the Valley Heights Locomotive Depot Heritage Museum.

A number of rail heritage items in Valley Heights are listed on the New South Wales State Heritage Register:
 The railway station and the locomotive depot including the roundhouse
 The railway gatehouse in Greens Parade, Valley Heights 
 Steam tram rolling stock held at the Valley Heights locomotive depot 
 a cattle van, a brake van, and two preserved steam engines

Bus
Blue Mountains Transit (formerly Pearce Omnibus and later Blue Mountains Bus Company) headquarters and depot are located in Valley Heights.

Tourist attractions
Valley Heights Locomotive Depot Heritage Museum is the home of the oldest remaining roundhouse in New South Wales, located 500 m from the eastern Springwood town boundary.

References 

 
Towns in New South Wales